Redlynch may refer to:

Redlynch, Queensland, Australia
 Redlynch, Somerset, England, United Kingdom
 Redlynch, Wiltshire, England, United Kingdom